The 2016 Cheez-It 355 at The Glen was a NASCAR Sprint Cup Series stock car race held on August 7, 2016 at Watkins Glen International in Watkins Glen, New York. Contested over 90 laps on the  road course, it was the 22nd race of the 2016 NASCAR Sprint Cup Series season. Denny Hamlin won the race, his second of the season. Joey Logano finished second. Brad Keselowski, A. J. Allmendinger and Tony Stewart rounded out the top-five.

The race had nine lead changes among eight different drivers, eight cautions for 20 laps and two red flags for 30 minutes and three seconds.

Report

Background

Watkins Glen International (nicknamed "The Glen") is an automobile race track located in Watkins Glen, New York at the southern tip of Seneca Lake. It was long known around the world as the home of the Formula One United States Grand Prix, which it hosted for twenty consecutive years (1961–1980), but the site has been home to road racing of nearly every class, including the World Sportscar Championship, Trans-Am, Can-Am, NASCAR Sprint Cup Series, the International Motor Sports Association and the IndyCar Series.

Initially, public roads in the village were used for the race course. In 1956 a permanent circuit for the race was built. In 1968 the race was extended to six hours, becoming the 6 Hours of Watkins Glen. The circuit's current layout has more or less been the same since 1971, although a chicane was installed at the uphill Esses in 1975 to slow cars through these corners, where there was a fatality during practice at the 1973 United States Grand Prix. The chicane was removed in 1985, but another chicane called the "Inner Loop" was installed in 1992 after a fatal accident during the previous year's NASCAR Winston Cup event.

The circuit is known as the Mecca of North American road racing and is a very popular venue among fans and drivers. The facility is currently owned by International Speedway Corporation.

Entry list
The preliminary entry list for the race included 40 cars and was released on August 1, 2016 at 9:55 a.m. Eastern time.

Practice

First practice

Final practice

Qualifying

He said afterwards that "the track is a little strange. It started out really slippery the first run. But, just really proud of my guys and everybody on this Stanley Toyota team. Dave Wilson from TRD (Toyota Racing Development, president) just came down. They’re a huge part of this. My teammates they’re really fast. Kyle (Busch) is really fast and Martin’s (Truex Jr.) is really fast. You’ve got to work a little bit in race trim but we’re starting upfront and we’ve got a great pit crew and hopefully we can put that Stanley in Victory Lane."

Qualifying results

Race

First half

Under clear blue New York skies, Carl Edwards led the field to the green flag at 2:53 p.m. The race proceeded orderly for the first five laps before Jeff Gordon sent Austin Dillon spinning in the inner loop on the fifth lap. The race continued under green. Debris in the outer loop brought out the first caution of the race on lap 11. The debris was a piece of hose. A few cars opted to pit under the caution. Aric Almirola and Kasey Kahne were tagged for their crews being over the wall too soon, and Regan Smith was tagged for speeding. All three restarted from the tail end of the field.

The race restarted on lap 16. Michael Annett overshot the inner loop, but continued on and was subsequently forced to serve a pass through penalty. A number of cars began pitting on lap 22. Jimmie Johnson was tagged for an uncontrolled tire and speeding. Ryan Blaney was tagged for speeding. Both were forced to serve a pass through penalty. Edwards pitted from the lead on lap 26 and handed the lead to Martin Truex Jr. Edwards was tagged for an outside tire violation and A. J. Allmendinger was tagged for speeding. Both were forced to serve pass through penalties. Truex pitted on lap 27 and handed the lead to Joey Logano. He pitted on lap 33 and handed the lead to Danica Patrick. He was tagged for speeding on pit road and was forced to serve a pass through penalty. She made her stop at lap 45 and the lead cycled to Kyle Busch.

Second half
The second caution of the race flew on lap 47 for a rogue tire on pit road. It came from the No. 83 of Matt DiBenedetto. Kurt Busch opted not to pit under the caution and assumed the lead. Chris Buescher and Paul Menard were tagged for their crews throwing equipment and restarted the race from the tail end of the field.

The race restarted on lap 53. Logano passed Busch climbing the esses to retake the lead. The third caution of the race flew on the same lap for a multi-car wreck on the shot chute. Exiting the outer loop, Ricky Stenhouse Jr. got loose and slid across the track into the guardrail. He bounced back and was t-boned by Johnson. Dillon, trying to avoid him, got into Greg Biffle and sent him into the guardrail. "The cars started checking up in front of me and they all moved out of the way and the 17 (Stenhouse) was sitting there, stopped," Johnson said. "I remember seeing a door number and I was so thankful it was the passenger-side door and not the driver-side door because I plowed him. I really hit the car hard. I was afraid that I might have injured him. But, thankfully he’s okay and everybody is all right." Johnson would go on to finish 40th, his first last-place finish of his career. The red flag was displayed for cleanup on the track. After 13 minutes and 19 seconds, it was lifted and the race was continued under caution.

The race restarted with 34 laps to go with Brad Keselowski in the lead. The fourth caution of the race flew for a multi-car wreck in the outer loop. It started when Ryan Newman got loose and turned David Ragan around, and also collected Clint Bowyer, Edwards and Alex Kennedy.

The race restarted with 31 laps to go. Landon Cassill went through the grass in the inner loop and spun out. The race remained green but then the fifth caution of the race came out with 26 laps to go for debris in the inner loop.

The race restarted with 23 laps to go. The sixth caution of the race came out with 15 laps to go for Kennedy losing an engine on the frontstretch.

The race restarted with 10 laps to go. Keselowski got in too hot into turn 1 and went into the runoff area. He lost the lead to Denny Hamlin as the seventh caution of the race flew for a two-car spin at the bottom of the esses involving DiBenedetto and Newman.

The race restarted with seven laps to go. The eighth caution of the race flew for a multi-car wreck in the outer loop. Exiting the inner loop, Buscher's car threw up a rooster tail of smoke and caused Menard to slow down. Kevin Harvick slowed down, rammed into him, got turned by Brian Scott and was rammed by Ragan. The red flag was displayed for the second time. After 16 minutes and 44 seconds, it was lifted and the race was continued under caution.

The race restarted with four laps to go. Exiting turn 11 on the final lap, Keselowski got into the back of Truex and sent him spinning, at which point Rick Allen yelled out "Aggressive goes around!" . Keselowski said after the race that he "went high and the 78 went high and by then I was already deep in the corner and got into him and turned him. That was really unfortunate and the last thing I wanted to see. This track here, when you drive into the corner, you commit and sometimes you don't know what will happen when you commit. The last thing I wanted to do was turn him." Truex said that what happened was "definitely unfortunate. I wish we could've seen what would've happened when we got to the start-finish line. I felt like I maybe had (winner Denny Hamlin) squared up a little bit off turn 11 and maybe could've drag raced him to the line. It'd have been fun to see, but it was all not to be with getting hit in the left rear. It's unfortunate, but it was hard racing at the end, all of us going for a win and all of us locked in the Chase. I guess (Keselowski) kind of races with that mentality, that 'Hey, it doesn't really matter where we finish or if we finish,' so I just have to be mindful of that when we're around him for the rest of the time." Allmendinger hopped the curb, hit Larson and sent him crashing into the inside wall. "Our last corner there, racing with Kyle I just… I can’t sorry enough ," Allmendinger said after the race. "It doesn’t help the case, I spun him out. I didn’t mean to spin him out. The No. 78 was spinning and I was starting to get my nose under Kyle to try to drag race him to the checkered. He was turning to come back down, but it was my fault. For fourth place it would be different if we were battling for the win, but I just hate it for him. It’s not going to help to say sorry, I know, I would be [ticked] off. He should be. I was going to be okay with that until that." Larson responded by saying Allmendinger "had already ran me down to the front stretch wall once with about 15 to go or so. Pretty dumb move right there too, but I was the smarter one racing for points, lifted, could have wrecked him, but didn’t. I don’t know. I don’t know. He wrecked me earlier in the year at Vegas. He has ran me hard, but we always race pretty well, but today was flat out stupid. I love his crew chief (Randall Burnett) to death; he was our engineer last year. It just sucks they are going to have to start building some more race cars because he has got a few coming." Hamlin was ahead of all this and scored the victory.

Post-race

Driver comments
Hamlin said afterwards that winning his first road course race "means a lot. I can’t tell you how disappointed I was we didn’t win the first one. I just tried the best I could and overshot the corner and I didn’t want to do it this time and so I probably under drove and let those guys be a little closer than I should’ve."

In his media availability following his runner-up finish, Logano said of the finish – be it the final lap or the final 15 laps – were "crazy anyway you look at it. Typical Watkins Glen. I mean, it’s just awesome, crazy racing, full contact. Just insane out there. So a lot of fun from the driver’s seat and I’m sure the fans loved it as well in front of a sold‑out grandstand. It was pretty cool when I pulled over for the red flag in front of the grandstands and I could hear just fans screaming and yelling and loving it. I thought, Man, this is really cool to be in the driver’s seat right now. Having those moments, I thought it was neat."

Following a fifth-place finish in his final road course race of his career, Tony Stewart said he was "just happy I’m not one of the guys who got tore up out there. The crazy part is what happens at the road courses. Everyone just seems to be putting themselves in bad positions they can’t get out of, and that’s how it ends up the way it does. There were guys who had Top 5 going into the last lap who couldn’t finish so we’ll take it.’’

Race results

Race summary
 Lead changes: 9 among different drivers
 Cautions/Laps: 8 for 20
 Red flags: 2 for 30 minutes and 3 seconds
 Time of race: 2 hours, 27 minutes and 48 seconds
 Average speed:

Media

Television
NBC Sports assigned the race to USA Network, as a result of Summer Olympic coverage on the primary channels used by the NBCUniversal group (during the time, USA also carried the Mid-Ohio Xfinity race and Premier League matches that typically air on NBC, NBCSN, or CNBC). Rick Allen, Jeff Burton and Steve Letarte had the call in the booth for the race. Dave Burns, Parker Kligerman, Mike Massaro and Marty Snider reported from pit lane during the race. It was the first NASCAR race broadcast on USA since 1984, but the first under Comcast ownership and under the NBC Sports banner.  It is expected that USA will carry races in 2020 and 2024, as under the 2015 NASCAR television contract, the same conflict with the Olympics will happen. When Martin Truex Jr spun on the last lap, it was made famous when Rick Allen made the call “aggressive goes around!”. It has become a meme in the NASCAR community ever since then.

Radio
Motor Racing Network had the radio call for the race, which was simulcast on Sirius XM NASCAR Radio.

Standings after the race

Note: Only the first 16 positions are included for the driver standings.. – Driver has clinched a position in the Chase for the Sprint Cup.

References

2016 NASCAR Sprint Cup Series
2016 in sports in New York (state)
August 2016 sports events in the United States
NASCAR races at Watkins Glen International